The TVyNovelas Award for Best Variety Program is presented annually by Televisa and the magazine TVyNovelas to honor the best Mexican television productions, including telenovelas. The award ceremony rotates between Mexico City and Acapulco.

Winners and nominees

1980s

1990s

2000s

2010s

Records  
 Most awarded program: Siempre en Domingo, 11 times.
 Most awarded program (ever winner): Siempre en Domingo, 11 times.
 Most nominated program: Siempre en Domingo with 11 nominations.
 Most nominated program without a win: Sabadazo with 4 nominations.
 Program winning after short time: Siempre en Domingo, 11 consecutive years.

References

External links 
TVyNovelas at esmas.com
TVyNovelas Awards at the univision.com

 Variety Program
Variety Program
Variety Program